Moniteau Township may refer to the following townships in the United States:

 Moniteau Township, Howard County, Missouri
 Moniteau Township, Randolph County, Missouri

See also 
 North Moniteau Township, Cooper County, Missouri
 South Moniteau Township, Cooper County, Missouri